Gainesville High School is a public high school located in Gainesville, Texas, United States. It is part of the Gainesville Independent School District located in north central Cooke County and classified as a 4A-Division 1 school by the UIL. In 2015, the school was rated "Met Standard" by the Texas Education Agency.

Academics
In 2013, Gainesville High School was runner up in the district 9-3A competition.

Athletics
The Gainesville Leopards compete in the following sports:

 Baseball
 Basketball
 Cross Country
 Football
 Golf
 Fishing
 Powerlifting
 Soccer
 Softball
 Tennis
 Track and Field
 Volleyball

State Titles
Football 
2003(3A/D1)
Boys Basketball 
2002(3A)

State Runner Up: Football - 1974(3A), 1976(3A), 1978(3A), 2005(3A/D1), Boys Basketball - 2000(3A)

Notable alumni
 Lew Allen, United States Air Force 4-Star General, 10th Chief of Staff of the U.S. Air Force, and 8th Director of the National Security Agency
 Rod Brown, NCAA All American  former NFL/CFL player
 Keith MacPherson, journalist
 Kevin Mathis, former NFL player
 Darcel McBath, former NFL player
 David Moore, NFL wide receiver for the Seattle Seahawks

References

External links
Gainesville ISD
Gainesville Athletics website

High schools in Cooke County, Texas
Public high schools in Texas